Joseph S. Labill (1837–1911) was a Private in the Union Army and a Medal of Honor recipient for his role in the American Civil War. 

He is buried in South Hill Cemetery Vandalia, Illinois.

Medal of Honor citation
Rank and organization: Private, Company C, 6th Missouri Infantry. Place and date: At Vicksburg, Miss., May 22, 1863. Entered service at: Vandalia, Ill. Birth: France. Date of issue: August 14, 1894. 

Citation:

Gallantry in the charge of the "volunteer storming party."

See also
List of Medal of Honor recipients
List of American Civil War Medal of Honor recipients: G–L

Notes

References

1837 births
1911 deaths
United States Army Medal of Honor recipients
United States Army soldiers
People of Illinois in the American Civil War
French-born Medal of Honor recipients
French emigrants to the United States
People from Vandalia, Illinois
American Civil War recipients of the Medal of Honor